The Grandfather is a 1998 Spanish drama film written, produced and directed by José Luis Garci. It stars Fernando Fernán-Gómez, Cayetana Guillén Cuervo and Rafael Alonso. The film, an adaptation of the novel of the same title by Benito Pérez Galdós, tells the story of an aristocrat's search to discover which of his two putative granddaughters resulted from an extramarital affair by his daughter-in-law.

Plot
Don Rodrigo, Count of Albrit, an old Spanish aristocrat, returns to turn-of-the-20th-century Spain after losing his fortune in America. The death of his only son has made him come back to his family estate, now in possession of his daughter-in-law Lucrecia. Upon his return, Don Rodrigo is pleased to meet his granddaughters, Dolly and Nelly, both of whom are adorable and attentive towards him. However, there is something nagging Don Rodrigo.

His son died heartbroken after he discovered his wife was having an affair with a Parisian painter and he left a letter stating that one of the girls is an illegitimate child, not of his blood, and therefore not entitled to be his true heir or true successor to his name and country estate. To the Count of Albrit, it is a matter of honor to know which of the girls is his real granddaughter. To uncover the truth, he confronts his son's widow, Lucrecia.

Lucrecia, now 32, is an English-born beauty with a scandalous reputation, who married the Count’s son when she was 18 and was unfaithful to her husband during their marriage, having an affair with a Parisian painter. Confronting her, the Count of Albrit, who opposed the match, tells her she killed his son, who died of sadness, loneliness, and shame brought on by her infidelity. Lucrecia replies that life is complicated, as are the emotions between men and women. In any case, she vehemently refuses to discuss the matter of her daughter’s paternity.

Lucrecia is well connected. Her latest liaison with Jaime, a government minister, has benefited the village in which her lands lie. When she sees her family relationships and a future move from the provinces to Madrid threatened, she tries to use her standing with the town’s authorities and the local clergy to thwart the old man in his quest. Their plan is to have the Count of Albrit confined in a nearby monastery, but the still-formidable Don Rodrigo quickly realizes their intentions and manages to escape their trap. He reminds some of the smarmy villagers of their checkered past in the days when the Count of Albrit was a power to be reckoned with.

During his quest to find the true origin of his granddaughters, the Count of Albrit befriends the girl’s teacher, poor old Pío Coronado. Too kind for his own good and saddled with six unseen but abusive and sluttish daughters, Coronado would like to kill himself, but he lacks the courage. The straightforward Count tells the tutor that he will be only too happy to toss him off a cliff into the sea, whenever Coronado is ready.

In the meantime, Senén, a mercenary servant, offers an incriminating love letter for sale. The letter implies that Dolly, the eldest of the two girls, who all along has defended forcefully the well being of her grandfather, is the legitimate child. With this piece of information, Don Rodrigo confronts his daughter in law once again. He asks her to allow him to live with Dolly in the family rural estate, but Lucrecia refuses to be parted from any of her daughters without admitting the truth about Dolly’s paternity. Soon after, Lucrecia’s confessor reveals to Don Rodrigo that he has been in the wrong. Nelly is his biological granddaughter. Finally reconciling with the Count of Albrit, Lucrecia leaves for Madrid with Nelly. Dolly stays behind with don Rodrigo, who has his wishes fulfilled. Pio Coronado buries his suicidal intentions.

Cast
Fernando Fernán-Gómez as Don Rodrigo, Count of Albrit
Rafael Alonso as Pio Coronado
Cayetana Guillén Cuervo as Lucrecia
Agustín González as Senén
Cristina Cruz Mínguez as Dolly
Alicia Rosas as Nelly
Fernando Guillén as the Major
Francisco Algora as the priest
Antonio Valero as Jaime

Awards
The film was an Academy Award nominee for Best Foreign Language Film. Fernando Fernán-Gómez won the Goya Award for Best Actor. There was a controversy that year between Garci and Goyas, in which the latter accused Garci of buying votes for the film. As a result, Garci quit the Spanish Academy. The accusations were denied later by the own Academy.

Alternate versions
The film was initially filmed as a television miniseries for Televisión Española and was edited with a shorter cut for its release in cinemas as a film. The miniseries was broadcast on La Primera Cadena of Televisión Española in 2001.

In 1972, Rafael Gil made a previous version titled La duda.

DVD release
The film was released on DVD in the United States on August 8, 2000 by Miramax Home Entertainment.

See also
 List of submissions to the 71st Academy Awards for Best Foreign Language Film
 List of Spanish submissions for the Academy Award for Best Foreign Language Film

References

External links 
 

1998 films
Spanish drama films
1990s Spanish-language films
1998 drama films
Films based on works by Benito Pérez Galdós
Films shot in Madrid
Films featuring a Best Actor Goya Award-winning performance
Films shot in Mexico
Remakes of Spanish films
Films set in Asturias
Films with screenplays by José Luis Garci
RTVE shows
Films directed by José Luis Garci
1990s Spanish films